Alex Zayne is an American professional wrestler. He is best known for his tenure with WWE where he wrestled on the NXT and WWE 205 Live brands under the ring name Ari Sterling.

He has also appeared on Impact Wrestling, Ring of Honor, NJPW Strong and Game Changer Wrestling.

Professional wrestling career

New Japan Pro Wrestling (2019-2021; 2021-Present)

Zayne made his debut in NJPW on November 11, 2019 at New Japan Showdown, in a tag team match, where he and Aaron Solow lost against Amazing Red and T. J. Perkins. Since March 2020, due to the COVID-19 pandemic in the United States, Zayne was unable to work on NJPW events in Japan, leading him to take part in NJPW Strong series. His big matches and performances led him to a WWE Try-out, which he pass leading him to leaving NJPW and be signed with WWE in the spring of 2021.

In the fall of 2021, Zayne was released from WWE as part of budget cuts relating to the Coronavirus (COVID-19) pandemic, and returned to NJPW Strong, and made his return match at New Japan Showdown defeating Ariya Davari. Zayne then later faced Will Ospreay on November 17, at the second NJPW's XTRA show in a losing effort. On May 1, Zayne was announced to take part in the 2022 Best of the Super Juniors in Japan. At the tournament, Zayned finished the tournament with a record of four wins and five losses, failing to advance to the finals of the tournament. During the tournament, Zayne formed a tag team with Ace Austin. However, on June 3, Austin joined the Bullet Club, this led Zayne questioning Austin's actions before being layed out by Austin and the Bullet Club. On the June 20th episode of IMPACT, Austin defeated Zayne with the help of Chris Bey.

Championships and accomplishments 

3-2-1 BATTLE!
Six Pack Challenge (2018)
Hope Wrestling
 HOPE Young Guns Championship (1 time)
Pro Wrestling Illustrated
Ranked No. 227 of the top 500 singles wrestlers of the PWI 500 in 2020
USA Championship Wrestling
 USACW Heavyweight Championship (1 time)
Ring of Honor
Honor Rumble Winner (2021)

References

External links 
 

1986 births
21st-century professional wrestlers
American male professional wrestlers
Living people
Masked wrestlers
Professional wrestlers from Kentucky
Sportspeople from Lexington, Kentucky